Gaeta is a rural locality in the Bundaberg Region, Queensland, Australia. In the  Gaeta had a population of 125 people.

Geography 
The northern boundary of the locality is part of the Kolan River. Kalpowar Road traverses the locality east-west and Gaeta Road traverses the locality north-south. Mount Gaeta  is in the central east of the locality, near the boundary with Takilberan. The headwaters of Gaeta Creek are on the east side of Mount Gaeta. This creek flows east to join Walily Creek.

History 
In 1881 the name of the Wallilah Post Office was changed to Gaeta Post Office. In October 1882 this Post Office was abolished, but following a petition from the residents (principally miners) the Post Office was re-established in December 1882.

Gold and other mineral mining projects continued sporadically in the area until at least 1997. Near the end of the 1800s there was a cyanide works nearby.

Gaeta Provisional School opened on 9 July 1906 and then closed in 1907. On 22 January 1912 it re-opened as Gaeta State School and closed in 1930. On 13 May 1957 it re-opened as Gaeta Provisional School. It closed permanently on 2 May 1975.

In the  Gaeta had a population of 125 people.

References

Further reading 

 

Bundaberg Region
Localities in Queensland